Cuthbert Blair Godwin (16 October 1891 – 23 October 1969) played first-class cricket for Somerset in two matches in the 1926 season. He was born at Frenchay, Bristol and died at Clifton, Bristol.

Godwin was a right-handed lower-order batsman and a right-arm slow bowler. Somerset lost both matches he played in by an innings. He made only eight runs in four innings and his only wicket came in his first game when he caught and bowled Frank Watson of Lancashire. In his second and final match, against Glamorgan he was the third victim in a hat-trick by Trevor Arnott, the first hat-trick by a Glamorgan player in first-class cricket.

References

1891 births
1969 deaths
English cricketers
Somerset cricketers